(born 23 May 1965) is a Japanese fencer. He competed in the team foil event at the 1988 Summer Olympics.

References

External links
 

1965 births
Living people
Japanese male foil fencers
Olympic fencers of Japan
Fencers at the 1988 Summer Olympics